Routledge Studies in Medieval Religion and Culture is a book series published by Routledge relating to the religion and culture of medieval Europe. The series editors are George Ferzoco and Carolyn Muessig.

Selected titles
The Barbarian North in Medieval Imagination: Ethnicity, Legend, and Literature, Robert W. Rix, 2014. 
Envisaging Heaven in the Middle Ages, Carolyn Muessig & Ad Putter, 2006. 
The Invention of Saintliness, Anneke B. Mulder-Bakker, 2002. 
Medieval Monstrosity and the Female Body, Sarah Alison Miller, 2010. 
Representations of Eve in Antiquity and the English Middle Ages, John Flood, 2010.

See also
Medieval World Series
Studies in the History of Medieval Religion

References 

Series of history books
Religion in the Middle Ages